Public Enemy Number One is a 2019 American documentary film directed by Robert Rippberger and produced by Robert Rippberger, Chris Chiari, and Ice-T. It looks at the war on drugs from 1968 until today and looks at trigger points in history that took cannabis from being a somewhat benign criminal activity into a self-perpetuating constantly expanding policy disaster. The film won Best Documentary Feature at the Seattle Film Festival, and Storyteller Award and Best Producer at Doc LA - Los Angeles Documentary Film Festival. It was released on various over-the-top media services after a limited theatrical release.

Synopsis
Public Enemy Number One sheds light on the politics behind the war on drugs from Nixon to today, with first of its kind insight from U.S. Drug Czars, and the founders of the "Just Say No" movement.

Reception

References

External links
 
 
 
 
 
 

American documentary films
2010s English-language films
2010s American films